This is a list of notable people who have been, or are currently, banned from entering China, courtesy of the Chinese Communist Party.

Currently banned

Previously banned

See also 
 List of people banned from entering Australia
 List of people banned from entering Ukraine
 List of people banned from entering the United Kingdom
 List of people banned from entering the United States

References 

China
Banned
People banned from entering
Banned from entering China
China